Ma mère me disait is the last Dalida album from the 1960s. It includes the hits "L'an 2005" and "Les couleurs de l'amour". Like the previous album, Le temps des fleurs, the songs are more melancholic and mostly ballads.

Track listing
 Ma mère me disait
 Deux colombes
 Les violons de mon pays
 L'an 2005
 L'anniversaire
 La vie en rose (Version 1965)
 Le vent n'a pas de mémoire
 Naké di naké dou
 Les couleurs de l'amour
 La ballade à temps perdu
 Le sable de l'amour
 Pars
 Zoum zoum zoum

Singles
1969 L'anniversaire / Zoum zoum zoum
1969 Les violons de mon pays / Le vent n'a pas de mémoire / Et pourtant j'ai froid / Le sable de l'amour
1969 L'an 2005 / Naké di naké dou / Ma mère me disait / Les anges noirs
1969 Le clan des Siciliens

References

Dalida albums
1969 albums
French-language albums
Barclay (record label) albums